Gordon Blaine Beatty (born April 25, 1964) is an American former professional baseball pitcher in Major League Baseball (MLB) and former pitching coach for the Frederick Keys.

Career

Minor league career
He was a ninth round 1984 Major League Baseball draft pick by the Baltimore Orioles.

He spent 12 seasons in the minors, compiling a record of 121–69 with a 3.26 Earned Run Average (ERA).  During the 1987 season with the Hagerstown Suns, Beatty went 11–1 with a 2.52 ERA in 13 starts. He completed four of his starts and allowed just 81 hits in 100 innings. In addition to having the highest winning percentage (.917) for the Carolina League that year, Beatty was named the Carolina League Pitcher of the Year.

Major league career
Beatty spent parts of two seasons in the majors with the New York Mets. He made 7 major league appearances with the Mets between 1989 and 1991 (he was injured in 1990).  After returning to the minor leagues, he retired as a player after the 1997 season.

Minor league pitching coach
Beatty was a pitching coach in the Pittsburgh Pirates system from 1998 to 2002 and the New York Mets system from 2003 to 2005.  He joined the Baltimore Orioles organization in 2006. He spent the 2006 to 2008 seasons with the Frederick Keys as their pitching instructor. He was the pitching coach for the 2009 Delmarva Shorebirds before returning to the Frederick Keys for the 2010 through 2012 seasons.  Beatty moved up to become the pitching coach for the Bowie Baysox for the 2013 and 2014 seasons. Blaine then returned to Delmarva for another stint as the Shorebirds pitching coach for the 2015 and 2016 seasons. Blaine was named the pitching coach for the Frederick Keys for the 2017 and 2018 seasons.

References

External links

1964 births
Living people
American expatriate baseball players in Canada
American expatriate baseball players in Mexico
Baseball coaches from Texas
Baseball players from Texas
Buffalo Bisons (minor league) players
Calgary Cannons players
Carolina Mudcats players
Charlotte O's players
Chattanooga Lookouts players
Diablos Rojos del México players
Edmonton Trappers players
Gulf Coast Pirates players
Hagerstown Suns players
Indianapolis Indians players
Jackson Mets players
Major League Baseball pitchers
Mexican League baseball pitchers
Minor league baseball coaches
New York Mets players
Newark Orioles players
People from Victoria, Texas
San Jacinto Central Ravens baseball players
Tidewater Tides players